Edward J. Speno (September 23, 1920 – February 17, 1971) was an American lawyer and politician from New York.

Life
He was born on September 23, 1920, in Syracuse, New York. He attended the public and parochial schools in Auburn. He graduated from Niagara University in 1942. During World War II he served in the U.S. Navy. After the war he graduated from Cornell Law School. In 1946, he married Audrey Bernichon, and they had four children. In 1949, he moved to East Meadow, New York, and practiced law there.

Speno was a member of the New York State Senate from 1955 until his death in 1971, sitting in the 170th, 171st, 172nd, 173rd, 174th, 175th, 176th, 177th, 178th and 179th New York State Legislatures. He was Chairman of the Republican Conference of the State Senate.

He died during the legislative session on February 17, 1971, in St. Peter's Hospital in Albany, New York, of a heart attack.

Sources

1920 births
1971 deaths
People from East Meadow, New York
Republican Party New York (state) state senators
Politicians from Syracuse, New York
Niagara University alumni
Cornell Law School alumni
20th-century American politicians
Lawyers from Syracuse, New York
20th-century American lawyers
United States Army personnel of World War II